The 1946–47 English football season was Aston Villa's 47th season in the Football League, this season playing in the Football League First Division.

George Cummings was the Villains club captain from 1945 to his retirement in 1949, and was popular with supporters due to his never-say-die spirit and no-nonsense defending.

In September 1946, Dicky Dorsett joined Aston Villa for £3,000. He would be top scorer for the season.

In January 1947, following a disagreement over preparations for a cup tie,  Trevor Ford left Swansea for first division Aston Villa. He would finish as the club's top scorer for three consecutive seasons between 1947–48 and 1950.

Ernie Callaghan previously held the Aston Villa club record for the oldest first team player, being 39 years 86 days old when he played against Grimsby Town in 1946. In his last game in April 1947, he was 39 years and 257 days. On 1 February 2011, American goalkeeper Brad Friedel set a new club record by playing a first-team game away at Manchester United ages 39 years and 259 days.

League table

References

External links
AVFC History: 1946–47 season

Aston Villa F.C. seasons
Aston Villa F.C. season